Gisèle Caille is a former French racing cyclist. She won the French national road race title in 1966.

References

External links
 

Living people
French female cyclists
Place of birth missing (living people)
Cyclists from Paris
1946 births